HMS Arrogant was an early wood screw frigate of the Royal Navy, launched in 1848 and sold in 1867. During the period of 1848–1850 she was commanded by Captain Robert FitzRoy.

In 1854 Arrogant was part of the fleet deployed to the Baltic Sea on the outbreak of the Crimean War, and served in that theatre until 1855. On 15 April 1854 Arrogant was one of a number of Royal Navy ships that captured the Russian brig Patrioten. Three of the ship's company, Lieutenant John Bythesea, Captain of the Mast George Ingouville and stoker William Johnstone won Victoria Crosses. Bythesea and Johnstone won theirs after they went ashore in one of the ship's boats on 9 August 1854, intercepted Russian soldiers carrying mailbags, and then forced the soldiers back to the ship along with the mailbags. Ingouville won his VC after heroically saving Arrogant's second cutter under heavy enemy fire off Viborg on 13 July 1855.

Later in the Crimean War, four vessels of the Royal Navy—Arrogant, Cossack, Magicienne, and Ruby—silenced the Russian batteries at a fort on Gogland on 21 July 1855, while the Anglo-French fleet went on to attack Sveaborg before returning home.

Arrogant was taken out of active service and fitted for Coast Guard duties in 1857. She was decommissioned in 1862 and was sold to be broken up in March 1867.

References 

Lyon, David & Winfield, Rif: The Sail and Steam Navy List: All the Ships of the Royal Navy 1815-1889 Chatham Publishing, 2004. .

External links
 

1848 ships
Crimean War naval ships of the United Kingdom
Frigates of the Royal Navy
Victorian-era frigates of the United Kingdom
Ships built in Portsmouth